Scott Sheffield (born October 20, 1973) is a professor of mathematics at the Massachusetts Institute of Technology. His primary research field is theoretical probability.

Research
Much of Sheffield's work examines conformal invariant objects which arise in the study of two-dimensional statistical physics models. He studies the Schramm-Loewner evolution SLE(κ) and its relations to a variety of other random objects. For example, he proved that SLE describes the interface between two Liouville quantum gravity surfaces that have been conformally welded together. In joint work with Oded Schramm, he showed that contour lines of the Gaussian free field are related to SLE(4). With Jason Miller, he developed the theory of Gaussian free field flow lines, which include SLE(κ) for all values of κ, as well as many variants of SLE.

Sheffield and Bertrand Duplantier proved the Knizhnik-Polyakov-Zamolodchikov (KPZ) relation for fractal scaling dimensions in Liouville quantum gravity. Sheffield also defined the conformal loop ensembles, which serve as scaling limits of the collection of all interfaces in various statistical physics models. In joint work with Wendelin Werner, he described the conformal loop ensembles as the outer boundaries of clusters of Brownian loops.

In addition to these contributions, Sheffield has also proved results regarding internal diffusion limited aggregation, dimers, game theory, partial differential equations, and Lipschitz extension theory.

Teaching

Since 2011, Sheffield has taught 18.600 (formerly 18.440), the introductory probability course at MIT.

Education and career
Sheffield graduated from Harvard University in 1998 with an A.B. and A.M. in mathematics. In 2003, he received his Ph.D. in mathematics from Stanford University. Before becoming a professor at MIT, Sheffield held postdoctoral positions at Microsoft Research, the University of California at Berkeley, and the Institute for Advanced Study. He was also an associate professor at New York University.

Awards
Scott Sheffield received the Loève Prize, the Presidential Early Career Award for Scientists and Engineers, the Sloan Research Fellowship, and the Rollo Davidson Prize. He was also an invited speaker at the 2010 meeting of the International Congress of Mathematicians and a plenary speaker in 2022. In 2017 he received the Clay Research Award jointly with Jason Miller. He was elected to the American Academy of Arts and Sciences in 2021. In 2023 he received the Leonard Eisenbud Prize for Mathematics and Physics of the AMS jointly with Jason Miller.

Books 
Scott Sheffield (2005), Random Surfaces, American Mathematical Society

References

1973 births
Living people
20th-century American mathematicians
21st-century American mathematicians
Harvard University alumni
Probability theorists
Stanford University alumni
Fellows of the American Academy of Arts and Sciences